Lee Yun-Hui (born 8 October 1980) is a retired South Korean female volleyball player. She was part of the South Korea women's national volleyball team.

She competed with the national team at the 2000 Summer Olympics in Sydney, Australia, finishing 8th.

See also
 South Korea at the 2000 Summer Olympics

References

External links
 

1980 births
Living people
South Korean women's volleyball players
Volleyball players at the 2000 Summer Olympics
Olympic volleyball players of South Korea